WH Capital, L.L.C., doing business as Waffle House, is an American restaurant chain with over 1,900 locations in 25 states in the United States. Most of the locations are in the South, where the chain is a regional cultural icon. Waffle House is headquartered in Norcross, Georgia, in the Atlanta metropolitan area.

History
The first Waffle House opened on Labor Day weekend in 1955 at 2719 East College Avenue in Avondale Estates, Georgia. That restaurant was conceived and founded by Joe Rogers Sr. and Tom Forkner. Rogers started in the restaurant business as a short-order cook in 1947 at the Toddle House in New Haven, Connecticut. By 1949, he became a regional manager with the now-defunct Memphis-based Toddle House chain, then he moved to Atlanta. He met Tom Forkner while buying a house from him in Avondale Estates.

Rogers's concept was to combine the speed of fast food with table service with around-the-clock availability.

Forkner suggested naming the restaurant "Waffle House", as waffles were the most profitable item on the 16-item menu.

Rogers continued to work with Toddle House, and to avoid conflict of interest, sold his interest to Forkner in 1956. In 1960, when Rogers asked to buy into Toddle House, and they refused, he moved back to Atlanta and rejoined Waffle House, now a chain of three restaurants, to run restaurant operations. Shortly after Joe returned full-time, Tom followed suit and left Ben S. Forkner Realty.

After opening a fourth restaurant in 1960, the company began franchising its restaurants and slowly grew to 27 stores by the late 1960s, before growth accelerated.

In 2007, Waffle House repurchased the original restaurant, which was sold by the chain in the early 1970s. The company restored it using original blueprints for use as a private company museum. The museum is used primarily for internal corporate events and tours.

In 2008, one of the biggest Waffle House franchises in the southeast, North Lake Foods, was bought out by Waffle House, Inc. North Lake Foods filed for Chapter 11 bankruptcy protection and closed some stores. Waffle House, Inc. plans to rehabilitate the franchise. In early 2009, East Coast Waffles bought North Lake Foods to become a new franchise.

The founders of the Waffle House brand died in 2017 within less than two months of each other: Joe Rogers Sr. died on March3 and Tom Forkner on April 26.

Operations
Each Waffle House location is open 24 hours daily, up to 365 days annually. This schedule has inspired the urban myth that "Waffle House doors have no locks".

The chain's restaurants almost always have jukeboxes, which have traditionally played 45-rpm singles and, in some cases, CDs. Waffle House has released music through its own record label, Waffle Records. It has released songs from "Saturday Night At My Place" by Gary Garcia released in 1995 to "They're Cooking Up My Order" by Alfreda Gerald released in 2006. The co-founder Joe Rogers had high standards and said, "If it sounded like a commercial, it got the ax." If the song makes the cut it'll be recorded and make its way to Waffle House jukeboxes. The songs are on ordinary discs, which are produced for Waffle House and are not commercially sold, but the chain has made a CD of some of the songs available for sale.

The servers use a proprietary version of diner lingo to call in orders, and the menu suggests some use of the same lingo when placing orders for hash brown potatoes: "scattered" (spread on the grill), "smothered" (with onions), "covered" (with cheese), "chunked" (with diced ham), "diced" (with diced tomatoes), "peppered" (with jalapeño peppers), "capped" (with mushrooms), "topped" (with chili), and "all the way" (with all available toppings). The option of "country" was added for hash browns with sausage gravy on them. Additionally, the company has a symbolic code by which grill operators are told the specific orders that go on each customer's plate; a 2017 ESPN.com story gave the following overview of this code:

Using accoutrements such as jelly packets, mayonnaise packets, pickles, cheese and hash brown pieces, grill operators are told what orders go on which plates. A jelly packet at the bottom of the plate signifies scrambled eggs. Raisin toast is signified by a packet of apple butter. A mustard packet facing up means a pork chop. Face-down means country ham. A pat of butter is a T-bone, and its place on the plate determines how the steak cooked, from well done at the top to rare at the bottom.

The company claims to be the world's largest seller of several of its menu items—the namesake waffles, ham, pork chops, grits, and T-bone steaks. It also claims that it serves 2% of all eggs in the U.S.

In the 1960s, S. Truett Cathy, the owner of a local diner called the Dwarf House, contracted with Waffle House to sell his proprietary chicken sandwich, the Chick-fil-A chicken sandwich. However, the Chick-fil-A sandwich quickly overtook Waffle House's own items in sales and Waffle House ended the deal, prompting Cathy to spin off Chick-fil-A into its own chain.

Locations

According to Waffle House's website as of August 2022, its number of locations per state consists of the following:

 Alabama – 153
 Arizona – 15
 Arkansas – 46
 Colorado – 10
 Delaware – 3
 Florida – 184
 Georgia – 434
 Illinois – 2
 Indiana – 24
 Kansas – 4
 Kentucky – 62
 Louisiana – 99
 Maryland – 12
 Mississippi – 88
 Missouri – 38
 New Mexico – 2
 North Carolina – 183
 Ohio – 80
 Oklahoma – 16
 Pennsylvania – 10
 South Carolina – 171
 Tennessee – 134
 Texas – 121
 Virginia – 68
 West Virginia – 5

Waffle and Steak

For years, Waffle House was known as "Waffle and Steak" in Indiana due to another chain of restaurants owning the rights to the Waffle House name in the state. Reportedly, the original Indiana Waffle House chain has started using the name "Sunshine Cafe". However, the d/b/a for "Sunshine Cafe" belongs to "Waffle House Greenwood Inc.", established in 1981. The oldest "Waffle House" entity listed with the Corporations office of the Indiana Secretary of State is "Waffle House of Bloomington, Indiana, Inc." established in 1967, and like Waffle House Greenwood, it is still an active corporation. The Bloomington operation, noted for being the city's second oldest restaurant, closed in 2013 and was demolished to make way for an apartment complex. (Many of the Waffle House corporations in Indiana have been dissolved.) "Waffle House Inc." of Norcross, Georgia, registered with Indiana in 1974. In 2005, the Waffle and Steak restaurants all adopted the "Waffle House" moniker, bringing the entire chain under the iconic name.

Food safety

In 2004, in response to a serious Salmonella problem in 2003 at a Chili's location in Vernon Hills, Illinois, and by four deaths in 1993 from E. coli in undercooked hamburger at a Jack in the Box, the television news magazine Dateline NBC investigated sanitation practices of popular American family restaurant chains, measuring the number of critical violations per inspection. The Waffle House averaged 1.6 critical violations per inspection. Waffle House's response to the study pointed out that they prepare all meals in an open kitchen, and consumers can readily observe their sanitation practices themselves.

On September 17, 2019, customers who ate at a Waffle House in Goose Creek, South Carolina, were exposed to Hepatitis A. One of the employees who had worked there tested positive for Hepatitis A. After upper management found out, they immediately shut down the Goose Creek Waffle House location to sanitize the facility. DHEC officials said they would be working with Waffle House to investigate possible exposures and provide guidance for preventive treatment for anyone who may be affected.

Cultural icon

As with other open-all-night eateries (including White Castle, Krystal, Denny's, Steak 'n Shake, IHOP and Krispy Kreme, as well as convenience store chain Sheetz), Waffle House has developed into a cultural icon. Part of their fame is that they are so prominent along Interstate highways in the South.

Waffle House is called the "low-rent roadside cafe featuring waffles" in the 1996 romantic comedy movie Tin Cup. It is also shown in the 2006 film ATL, the 2018 film Love, Simon, and the movie Due Date. A Waffle House in Nashville was the setting for a routine by the stand-up comedian Bill Hicks.

Reddit co-founder Alexis Ohanian had an epiphany at Waffle House after his attempts at being an immigration lawyer failed. This epiphany was what led Ohanian to help create Reddit.

Waffle House is referenced in popular music, as in the songs "The Bad Touch" by the Bloodhound Gang, "24 Hours" by TeeFlii and "Big Amount" by 2 Chainz, "Alley Oop" by Yung Gravy featuring Lil Baby, in the title of the Hootie & the Blowfish album Scattered, Smothered and Covered, and in "Welcome to Atlanta" by Jermaine Dupri. Country singer Alan Jackson mentions Waffle House in his song "Good Time".

Disaster recovery

According to the Federal Emergency Management Agency, Waffle House is one of the top four corporations, along with Walmart, The Home Depot, and Lowe's, for disaster response. Waffle House has an extensive disaster management plan with on-site and portable generators and positioned food and ice ahead of severe weather events such as a hurricane. This helps mitigate the effects of a storm on the power grid and the supply chains. The company prepares 'jump teams' of recovery staff and supplies, brought in from outside disaster-affected areas, so local staff can focus on helping their own homes and families. The ability of a Waffle House to remain open after a severe storm, possibly with a limited menu, is used by FEMA as a measure of disaster recovery known as the Waffle House index.

See also

Denny's
Golden Nugget Pancake House
Huddle House
IHOP
The Original Pancake House
Walker Brothers

References

External links

The first Waffle House restaurant as seen in a then/now photo.
EEOC vs. Waffle House, Inc.
Waffle House historical marker
Waffle House locations map

 
Fast-food chains of the United States
Restaurant franchises
Pancake houses
Waffles
Cuisine of the Southern United States
Economy of the Southeastern United States
Companies based in Gwinnett County, Georgia
Restaurants established in 1955
Restaurant chains in the United States
1955 establishments in Georgia (U.S. state)